Purple Gang can refer to:

The Purple Gang, Jewish American bootleggers and hijackers in Detroit during the 1920s
East Harlem Purple Gang, Italian American gang of drug dealers and hitmen
 The Purple Gang (film), a 1960 American crime film 
The Purple Gang (band), British rock band active intermittently since the 1960s
The Purple Gang (American band), a 1960s garage/psychedelic band
Purple People Eaters, defensive line of the Minnesota Vikings from the late 1960s to the late 1970s